Zalmodegikos was a Getan king who ruled around 200 BC.

References

Heads of state
Getae
Thracian kings
Place of birth unknown
Year of birth unknown
3rd-century BC rulers